Pakistan Mercantile Exchange Limited (formerly National Commodity Exchange Limited) is Pakistan's first futures commodity market having its registered Head office in Karachi, Sindh. It is the only company in Pakistan to provide a centralized and regulated place for commodity futures trading and is regulated by Securities and Exchange Commission of Pakistan (SECP). It has started full trading activities on 11 May 2007.

History 
Pakistan Mercantile Exchange (formerly National Commodity Exchange Limited) is the first technology driven, web-based, demutualized multi-commodity exchange in Pakistan. The exchange registered trading volume of Rs 306 billion in October 2018. It is licensed and regulated by the Securities and Exchange Commission of Pakistan.

PMEX is owned by National Bank of Pakistan Limited (33.98%), Pakistan Stock Exchange Limited (28.41%), ISE Towers REIT Management Limited (17.76%), LSE Financial Service Limited (7.25%), Pak Brunei Investment Company Limited (6.80%), Zarai Taraqiati Bank Limited (2.90%), Pak Kuwait Investment Company Limited (2.90%), Individuals (0.0001%).

Pakistan Mercantile Exchange Limited started its operations in May 2007 as a fully electronic exchange with nationwide reach.

Pakistan Mercantile Exchange is the first Exchange in Pakistan to employ modern risk management techniques based on Value-at-Risk with a pre-trade risk check in real time. The Exchange acts as a central counterparty to both buyers and sellers through a novation process and provide clearing & settlement on a T+0 basis using on-line bank transfer mechanism.

The Membership of Pakistan Mercantile Exchange is open to all. Currently there are more than 300 members registered on the Exchange and the number is growing every month. The members include brokerage houses, individuals and industry specialists ranging from traders to exporters and importers and commodity specialists.

Pakistan Mercantile Exchange recently changed its name from National Commodity Exchange Limited to better reflect its broad mandate and scope of activity to trade all types of futures contracts.

The Exchange recently increased its timings and now operates 21 hours.

Pakistan Mercantile Exchange (PMEX) has started offering MetaTrader 5 (MT5) trading platform to all its market participants.

Commodities traded 

Pakistan Mercantile Exchange (formerly National Commodity Exchange Limited) initially started trading in Gold only. This listing was followed by the first gold physical delivery in August 2007. Additional Products were subsequently launched – IRRI -6 rice in March 2008 Palm Olien futures in June 2008 and KIBOR futures in Jan 2009. Crude Oil and Silver contracts were listed in Nov 2009. Recently the Sugar contract was also added on June 27, 2011.

The main commodities traded on the Exchange have been Gold, Silver and Crude Oil. There are various contracts in each. Gold has eight contracts namely Gold 1 ounce, Gold 100 ounce, Gold 1 Tola, Gold 50 Tola, Gold 100 tola, Gold Kilo, Gold 100 g, and Minigold 10 g. Tola gold and minigold are deliverable contracts. Furthermore, there are two contracts in Silver – 100 ounce and 500 ounce and two contracts in Crude Oil – 10 barrels and 100 barrels. The smaller lot sizes for Silver and Crude Oil were introduced very recently in June 2011.

References

External links
 PMEX
 Daily Times Article
 Brecorder
 Mondovisione
 Tribune

Commodity exchanges in Pakistan
Economy of Karachi
Futures exchanges